István Boros (20 April 1909 – 15 April 1994) was a male Hungarian international table tennis player.

He won two bronze medals at the 1932 World Table Tennis Championships in the men's singles and the men's doubles with Tibor Házi. The following year he won another bronze in the men's doubles with Béla Nyitrai at the 1933 World Table Tennis Championships.

He was of Jewish origin and was a National champion of Hungary.

See also
 List of table tennis players
 List of World Table Tennis Championships medalists

References

Hungarian male table tennis players
World Table Tennis Championships medalists